Conrad Theodor, or Coen van Oven (September 21, 1883 – May 4, 1963), was a Dutch painter.

Biography
According to the RKD he was born in Dordrecht and in 1903 he became a member of the drawing academy in Antwerp. The following year he was a member of the drawing academy in Brussels. In the winters he took lessons from the painter Jan Veth in Bussum. In 1905 he was a pupil of Roland Larij, the chairman of the drawing academy in Dordrecht (Pictura) and in 1906 he became a pupil of the German architect Adolph Meyer 
in Berlin for two years. van Oven's work was included in the 1939 exhibition and sale Onze Kunst van Heden (Our Art of Today) at the Rijksmuseum in Amsterdam.

He is known for his characteristic portraits of family members and landscapes. In 1913 he moved to Amsterdam, where he stayed except for a short period in South Africa after the war where he visited Kimberley and Pretoria during the years 1947-1949. He was a member of Arti et Amicitiae and the group called De Onafhankelijken.

References

Exhibition catalog Coen van Oven, schilder 1883-1963, by Mariek Eggenkamp-Rotteveel Mansveld (editor), Amsterdam, 1998

External links
 Coen van Oven website
Coen van Oven on artnet

1883 births
1963 deaths
Artists from Dordrecht
20th-century Dutch painters
Dutch male painters
20th-century Dutch male artists